Linden B. Bateman (born July 11, 1940) was a previous Republican Idaho State Representative from 2010 until 2016 representing District 33 in the B seat. He previously served five terms in the Idaho House of Representatives from 1977 until 1986. He was born in Salt Lake City.

Education
Bateman earned his bachelor's degree in political science from Brigham Young University.

Career and life
He spent his career as a high school teacher. He was a history and government teacher. He later worked as supervisor of student teachers for Brigham Young University-Idaho.  He was a founding member of the Bonneville County Historical Society and was involved in forming that county's history museum. He wrote the script for the short film Idaho Women in White and was also involved in compiling the photos used for it.

Bateman is a member of the Church of Jesus Christ of Latter-day Saints.

Elections

2014 
Bateman was unopposed in the Republican primary. Bateman defeated Jim De Angelis in the general election .

2012 
Bateman won the May 15, 2012, Republican primary with 2,680 votes (75.6%) against David Lyon, facing Democratic challenger Henry De Angelis in the general election on November 6, 2012.

Bateman supported Mitt Romney for the Republican Party nominee.

2010 
When Republican Representative Russ Mathews left the District 33 B seat open, Bateman won the May 25, 2010, Republican primary with 2,465 votes (66.8%) against Dane Watkins, winning the November 2, 2012, general election with 6,036 votes (59.1%) against John McGimpsey (D).

In Office
Bateman was a force behind Idaho's rescinding of its ratification of the Equal Rights Amendment to the US Constitution. Bateman was a major force behind the designation of March 4 as Idaho Day. He also pushed to have cursive included in the elementary curriculum of Idaho. Bateman has continued as a speaker on history since he left the Idaho House.

References

External links
Linden B. Bateman at the Idaho Legislature
 

1940 births
Living people
Brigham Young University alumni
Republican Party members of the Idaho House of Representatives
People from Idaho Falls, Idaho
Politicians from Salt Lake City
21st-century American politicians
Latter Day Saints from Idaho